Top of the Heap is an American sitcom that ran for seven episodes on Fox from April 7 until May 19, 1991, the most successful of three attempted spin-offs of Married... with Children (the other two being Radio Free Trumaine and Enemies). The pilot was episode 20 of the fifth season of Married... with Children. The series aired Sunday at 9:30 pm.

Synopsis
Top of the Heap focused on the attempts of two minor Married... with Children characters—Charlie Verducci (Joseph Bologna) and his son Vinnie (Matt LeBlanc)—to get rich. Charlie's "master plan" is for Vinnie to marry into a wealthy family; to this end, the two Chicago slum residents try to get into high society. Vinnie also owns a cat, Mr. Fluffy, who is despised by Charlie. Mona Mullins (Joey Lauren Adams) is a girl from the Verduccis' neighborhood who has a crush on Vinnie, who tries to fend her off. Alixandra Stone (Rita Moreno) is the manager of a country club, and the object of Charlie's affections. Vinnie gets a job at a country club, which also employs a security guard, Emmet Lefebvre.

In some episodes actors from Married... with Children made guest appearances as their characters from the show, thus reinforcing the connection between the two series. Al Bundy (Ed O'Neill) appeared in the pilot (which itself was an episode of Married... with Children), Bud Bundy (David Faustino) made an appearance in an episode in the country club, and Kelly Bundy (Christina Applegate) appeared twice on the show in cameo appearances. However, none of the three Bundys made an appearance together.

In 1992, there was a continuation of this series entitled Vinnie & Bobby; it also lasted for only seven episodes. The only characters returning in this version were the eponymous Vinnie (Matt LeBlanc), Mona Mullins (Joey Lauren Adams) and Bobby Grazzo (Robert Torti), who only appeared in the last episode of this version of the show.

Characters

Episodes

Backdoor pilot (1991)

Season 1 (1991)

References

External links
 

1990s American sitcoms
1991 American television series debuts
1991 American television series endings
American television spin-offs
Articles containing video clips
English-language television shows
Fox Broadcasting Company original programming
Married... with Children
Television series by Sony Pictures Television
Television shows set in Chicago
Television series created by Ron Leavitt